Guillaume Katz (born 4 February 1989) is a Swiss former professional footballer.

Career
In 2012, Israeli club Hapoel Tel Aviv attempted to bring Katz and Danish winger David Boysen in on loan as the club was trying to strengthen their squad targeting Jewish footballers.

On 25 May 2015, Katz wore the captain's armband in his final match for Lausanne-Sport. It was reported by Swiss site, 24 heures that offers were being mulled with Polish and Israeli clubs but Katz was interested in a free transfer to the US or Canada.

Career statistics

References

External links
 

1989 births
Sportspeople from Lausanne
Swiss Jews
Living people
Swiss men's footballers
Jewish footballers
Switzerland youth international footballers
Association football defenders
FC Lausanne-Sport players
FC Stade Nyonnais players
FC Winterthur players
FC Echallens players
Swiss Super League players
Swiss Challenge League players
Swiss 1. Liga (football) players